Petar Brajan (fl. 1340–42) was a Serbian župan (count) that built the White Church in Karan, Užice, as a family funeral church. The church was erected on site of an older temple from the 10th century, mentioned in a charter edited by Byzantine Emperor Basil II in 1020. There are fresco portraits of Brajan and his family (his wife, son and three daughters) and of the Serbian Emperor Stefan Dušan (while he was a king), and his son Uroš V.

See also
Serbian nobility in the Middle Ages

References

14th-century Serbian nobility
People from Užice
People of the Kingdom of Serbia (medieval)